The 1912 Western State State Normal Hilltoppers football team represented Western State Normal School (later renamed Western Michigan University) as an independent during the 1912 college football season.  In their sixth season under head coach William H. Spaulding, the Hilltoppers compiled a 3–2–1 record and outscored their opponents, 86 to 49. End Edgar Roper was the team captain.

Attendance at Western State reached 650 students in the fall of 1912.

Schedule

References

Western State Normal Hilltoppers
Western Michigan Broncos football seasons
Western State Normal Hilltoppers football